Alagëz may refer to:
 Alagyaz, Armenia
 Aragats, Talin, Armenia